Genesee Community College (GCC) is a public community college with its main campus in Batavia, New York. It has campus centers in Albion, Medina, Warsaw, Dansville, Arcade, Lima (previously Lakeville), New York. Thus, the college covers areas not only inside of Genesee County but also in Orleans County, Livingston County and Wyoming County. This two-year college also offers housing facilities to out-of-area students, although the school is attended primarily by commuters. Additionally, GCC offers some degree and certificate programs online.

History

Genesee Community College was founded in 1966 as part of the State University of New York system.  On September 27, 1967, Genesee Community College officially opened classes to full and part-time students.  In January 1972, Genesee Community College relocated to its current permanent address on One College Road in the town of Batavia.

In 1991, GCC would see expansion with the addition of the Stuart Steiner Theatre, which houses a theater and stage, as well as expanded classrooms for the various arts programs.  In 2000, the Conable Technology Building was added to the main campus facilities, a two-story  annex that is the center for most of GCC's technological programs and apparatus.  In January 2006, GCC expanded again, adding the Wolcott J. Humphrey III Student Union, a central location for student affairs and organizations.

In February 2009, the plans for another campus center in Lima was announced, which will replace the Lakeville satellite campus  and in June 2009, construction of the campus was completed. The  campus features two modern computer labs and a state-of-the-art science lab, five to seven classrooms, a lobby and reception area, as well as faculty, staff, advisor, and administrative offices.

Academics

Genesee Community College offers over 60 associate degree and certificate programs.  Many students of the associate degree programs eventually transfer to four-year schools to complete their degree. College-ready students can complete their choice of 16 fully online programs at GCC.

Athletics
Genesee Community College currently has 14 intercollegiate men's and women's teams in basketball, baseball, lacrosse, soccer, softball, golf, swimming, cheerleading, and volleyball. Collectively, they are known as the Cougars, and their colors are blue and gold.

Roz Steiner Gallery
The Roz Steiner Gallery is Genesee Community College's (GCC) only gallery and is located in Batavia, New York, United States. The gallery is located in GCC's Center for the Arts, to the east of the Stuart Steiner Theatre lobby. The Roz Steiner Gallery opened in spring 2011. While the Steiner Gallery does not house a permanent collection, it typically features three professional exhibitions and two student-work exhibitions each academic year. The gallery was financed with funding from the State University of New York Construction Fund, and gifts from the Genesee Community College Foundation and Genesee Community College Association.

Media 
GCC also has a radio station called The Music. It can be heard on 90.7 FM and online. It broadcasts to an approximately  radius of the school.

References

External links

Official website

Educational institutions established in 1966
SUNY community colleges
Education in Genesee County, New York
Education in Orleans County, New York
1966 establishments in New York (state)
Buildings and structures in Genesee County, New York
NJCAA athletics